Clayton Arthur Droullard (October 11, 1924 – July 26, 2012) was an American football coach.  He was the head football coach at Morningside College in Sioux City, Iowa.  He held that position for four seasons, from 1951 until 1954.  His coaching record at Morningside was 16–16–1.  Droullard graduated from the University of Dubuque, where he lettered in football and basketball.

Head coaching record

References

External links
 

1924 births
2012 deaths
American men's basketball players
Dubuque Spartans football players
Dubuque Spartans men's basketball players
Morningside Mustangs football coaches
People from Cuba City, Wisconsin